Louise Ipsen (1822-1905) was a Danish businessperson.

Ipsen was born to merchant Jacob Bierring (1783-1865) and Cathrine Gemynthe (1790-1869) and married factory owner Rasmus Peter Ipsen (1815-1860) in 1843.

The year of her marriage, her spouse founded the ceramics manufacturer P. Ipsens Enke. She was an active partner in the development of the business, and took over the management herself when she became a widow in 1860. She continued to manage it with success until her death. In 1871, she obtained a royal warrant of appointment as Kgl. Hof Leverandør. The business became internationally famous during her period as manager and she exported to Paris and London and participated in international exhibitions. She was described as strong, warm and humble.

Ipsen died in 1905.

References

1822 births
1905 deaths
19th-century Danish businesswomen